Angela Lettiere Simon (born April 4, 1972) is a former professional tennis player from the United States.

Biography
Lettiere was raised in Vero Beach, Florida, before moving to Sunrise, Florida in 1990 to train at the local tennis academy. She finished her schooling at St. Thomas Aquinas High School.

College 
She went on to attend the University of Georgia.  In 1994 she was a member of Georgia's NCAA championship winning team and claimed the NCAA singles championship, beating UCLA's Keri Phebus in the final. While at Georgia, she won the Honda Sports Award as the nation's best female tennis player in 1994.

Professional 
On her WTA Tour main draw debut in 1994, Lettiere upset world number 32 Katerina Maleeva at Stratton Mountain. She received a wildcard to compete in the 1994 US Open, where she fell in the first round to Argentine qualifier María José Gaidano.

It was as a doubles player that Lettiere had the most impact on the WTA Tour, reaching a best ranking of 40 in the world. In 1996 she teamed up with Nana Miyagi to a runner-up finish in Chicago's Ameritech Cup, which included a quarter-final win over second seeds Lindsay Davenport and Mary Joe Fernandez.

WTA Tour finals

Doubles (0-1)

ITF finals

Doubles: 10 (6–4)

References

External links
 
 

1972 births
Living people
American female tennis players
Georgia Lady Bulldogs tennis players
Universiade medalists in tennis
Universiade bronze medalists for the United States
Tennis people from Florida
People from Vero Beach, Florida
Medalists at the 1991 Summer Universiade